The 1971 NCAA Men's University Division Ice Hockey Tournament was the culmination of the 1970–71 NCAA University Division men's ice hockey season, the 24th such tournament in NCAA history. It was held between March 18 and 20, 1971, and concluded with Boston University defeating Minnesota 4–2. All games were played at the Onondaga War Memorial in Syracuse, New York.

This was the first time that a team with a losing record participated in an NCAA tournament.

Qualifying teams
Four teams qualified for the tournament, two each from the eastern and western regions. The ECAC tournament champion and the two WCHA tournament co-champions received automatic bids into the tournament. An at-large bid was offered to a second eastern team based upon both their ECAC tournament finish as well as their regular season record.

Format
The ECAC champion was seeded as the top eastern team while the WCHA co-champion with the better regular season record was given the top western seed. The second eastern seed was slotted to play the top western seed and vice versa. All games were played at the Onondaga War Memorial. All matches were Single-game eliminations with the semifinal winners advancing to the national championship game and the losers playing in a consolation game.

Tournament Bracket

Note: * denotes overtime period(s)

Semifinals

(W1) Denver vs. (E2) Boston University

(E1) Harvard vs. (W2) Minnesota

Consolation Game

(W1) Denver vs. (E1) Harvard

National Championship

(E2) Boston University vs. (W2) Minnesota

All-Tournament Team
G: Dan Brady* (Boston University)
D: Bob Brown (Boston University)
D: Bruce McIntosh (Minnesota)
F: Dean Blais (Minnesota)
F: Don Cahoon (Boston University)
F: Steve Stirling (Boston University)
* Most Outstanding Player(s)

References

Tournament
NCAA Division I men's ice hockey tournament
NCAA University Division Men's Ice Hockey Tournament
NCAA University Division Men's Ice Hockey Tournament
Ice hockey in Syracuse, New York
College sports tournaments in New York (state)
Ice hockey competitions in New York (state)